Lassi Etelätalo (born 30 April 1988) is a Finnish athlete specialising in the javelin throw. He represented his country at the 2019 World Championships in Doha finishing fourth in the final. In addition, he also finished fourth at the 2014 European Championships in Zürich.

His personal best in the event is 86,44 metres set in Munich in 2022.

International competitions

References

1988 births
Living people
Finnish male javelin throwers
World Athletics Championships athletes for Finland
Finnish Athletics Championships winners
Athletes (track and field) at the 2020 Summer Olympics
Olympic athletes of Finland
20th-century Finnish people
21st-century Finnish people
European Athletics Championships medalists